Markabygd or Markabygda is a village in the municipality of Levanger in Trøndelag county, Norway. Markabygda Church is located here, and there is also a private Montessori school.

References

External links
 Official site

Villages in Trøndelag
Levanger